Good Morning Canada was a national weekend breakfast television show aired on the CTV Television Network in Canada from circa fall 2000 to early 2009.

The program was pre-taped during the week and aired twice each weekend, Saturday morning at 8 and Sunday morning at 7, with news inserts provided by CTV Newsnet (now known as CTV News Channel). The show's content consists mainly of feature segments originally produced for local CTV newscasts.

The show was always produced at one of the network's stations other than flagship CFTO Toronto, moving every three to six months. There was a single host at any one time, generally a personality from the then-current producing station.

Unlike the weekend editions of American network morning shows, the program was separate from CTV's weekday morning program Canada AM. In the early 1990s, the network carried a one-hour weekend program, Canada AM Weekend, re-airing the show's best segments of the week. Good Morning Canada launched several years after Canada AM Weekend was cancelled and has no connection to the earlier program.

Due to low ratings and network cutbacks, the show was discontinued. The last episode aired on February 1, 2009.

Hosts and locations
 September 2001 to November 2002: Nancy Regan, CJCH-TV Halifax
 June 2007 to September 2007: Maria Panopolis, CJCH-TV Halifax
 September 2007 to January 2008: Coleen Christie, CIVT-TV Vancouver
 February 2007 to May 2008: Maralee Caruso, CKY-TV Winnipeg
 June 2008 to September 2008: Lori Graham, CFCF-TV Montreal
 October 2008 to January 2009: Michelle Tonner, CICI-TV Sudbury
 Date unknown: Tara Robinson, CKCK-TV Regina
 Date unknown: Carrie Doll, CFRN-TV Edmonton
 Date unknown: Jocelyn Laidlaw, CFCN-TV Calgary
 Date unknown: Janet Stewart, CFTO-TV Toronto
 Date unknown: Darren MacFadyen, CFTO-TV Toronto
 Date unknown: Tom Knowlton, CKCO-TV Kitchener

References

External links
Good Morning Canada website

Television morning shows in Canada
CTV Television Network original programming
2000 Canadian television series debuts
2009 Canadian television series endings
2000s Canadian television news shows